Cisthene citrina is a moth of the family Erebidae. It was described by Herbert Druce in 1885. It is found in Panama.

References

Cisthenina
Moths described in 1885